Pye Green is part of Hednesford, Staffordshire, England, running from Chadsmoor and Hednesford, across the Pye Green valley and to the edge of The Chase. It is situated between the A34 and A460 roads.

The area consists mainly of mixed private and council housing stock, with many of the latter being privately purchased.  The area also boasts an above average performing primary school and few shops near the former open cast coal mine site, now disused and a large, public open space.

Pye Green climbs to a high point and Birmingham city centre can be clearly seen when the weather is good.  As a  result of this, Pye Green hosts the local BT communications tower landmark (which can be seen from the nearby M6 motorway, relaying line-of-sight microwave communication links for similar towers at Sutton Common in Cheshire and the tower in the centre of Birmingham, eventually down to London BT Tower.

Pye Green also has a local community centre where various activities are held for the local area.  House prices are mixed across the area.

The nearest railway station is Hendesford on the Chase Line between Birmingham New Street and Rugeley Trent Valley.  Bus services are provided by Chaserider circular services 25/26 with a 15-minute frequency, Mon-Sat.

External links
 BT Transmitter

Villages in Staffordshire
Hednesford